Anna Farhi (born ) is an Israeli female former volleyball player, born in Bulgaria, who plays as a middle blocker. She was part of the Israel women's national volleyball team from 2011 to 2015. She competed at the 2011 and 2015 Women's European Volleyball Championships.

History 
In her youth, Farhi played for Bulgaria's under-17 team before travelling to Switzerland at the age of 21. While playing an exhibition game in Switzerland, the coach of Israel's women's national volleyball team convinced her to come to Israel and play for their national team.

References

Further reading 
 Womens' Volleyball Back to Europe
 2012 CEV Volleyball Challenge Cup - Women
 Player Statistics
 Women's Volleyball European Championship - Israel v Czech Republic

Israeli women's volleyball players
Living people
1980 births
Place of birth missing (living people)